Rachid Chékhémani (born 1 October 1973 in Barentin, Seine-Maritime) is a French long-distance runner.

He finished sixteenth in the 5000 metres at the 2002 European Athletics Championships. He competed at the World Cross Country Championships in 2002, 2003 and 2005.

Personal bests
1500 metres - 3:35.22 min (1999)
3000 metres - 7:38.57 min (2001)
5000 metres - 13:20.14 min (2001)

External links

1973 births
Living people
French male long-distance runners
People from Barentin
Sportspeople from Seine-Maritime
20th-century French people
21st-century French people